Highland School is a public school in Craigmont, Idaho, the only school in the Highland Joint School District #305. Located on the Camas Prairie in rural Lewis County in the north central part of the state, it is often referred to as "Highland-Craigmont" to distinguish it from the larger and later established Highland High School in Pocatello.  The school colors are black and gold and the mascot is Harold the husky.

In addition to Craigmont, the school district draws from Reubens, Winchester, and Melrose.

Consolidation
In 1962, the school districts in Craigmont, Winchester, and Reubens were consolidated into the new Highland Joint School District. The new name of Craigmont High and the mascot were selected by the student body. The former mascots were Craigmont Cougars, Winchester Loggers, and Reubens Demons. The current campus was constructed ten years earlier, in 1952.

Athletics
The Highland Huskies compete in athletics in IHSAA Class 1A Division II (formerly A-4) in the White Pine League.

State titles
Boys
 Basketball (1): (A-4) 1984 
 Track (2): (A-4) 1995, 1996 

Girls
 Basketball (4): (A-4) 1978, 1985, 1993, 1995  (introduced in 1976, A-4 in 1977)
 Track (1): 1993  (introduced in 1971, A-4 in 1993)

References

External links

MaxPreps.com - Highland Huskies
http://whitepineleague.com/schools/highland.html - Whitepine League
https://www.athletic.net/TrackAndField/School.aspx?SchoolID=1987 - Athletic.net

Public high schools in Idaho
Schools in Lewis County, Idaho
Public middle schools in Idaho
1962 establishments in Idaho